Annona paludosa is a species of plant in the family Annonaceae. It is native to Brazil, French Guiana, Guyana, Suriname and Venezuela. Jean Baptiste Christophore Fusée Aublet, the French pharmacist and botanist who first formally described the species, named it after its swampy ( in Latin) habitat.

Description
It is a bush reaching 1.2-1.5 meters in height.  Its branches have numerous light brown lenticels. Its oblong, membranous leaves are 16-20 by 6-7.5 centimeters and come to a point at their tip.  The mature leaves are hairless on their green upper surface, but have woolly rust colored hairs on their reddish lower surfaces.  The leaves have 18-20 secondary veins emanating from each side of their midribs.  Its petioles are 5 by 3 millimeters, densely covered in woolly hairs, and have a groove on their upper surface. Its flowers are on 10-15 millimeter long peduncles that occur alone or in pairs.  The peduncles are covered in woolly hairs and have a bracteole at their base and midpoint. Its sepals are united to form a calyx with 3 triangular lobes that are 10 by 10 millimeters and come to a tapering point.  The outer surfaces of the sepals are covered in rust-colored woolly hairs.  Its flowers have 6 petals arranged in two rows of 3.  The thick, oval, outer petals have margins that touch but are not united.  The outer petals are 15-18 by 15 millimeters, have a central ridge, and are covered in fine gray woolly hairs.  The thinner inner petals are 14-15 by 6 millimeters and alternate with the outer petals.  The inner petals are concave and covered on both surfaces with fine gray woolly hairs. Its flowers have numerous stamens that are 2.8-3 millimeters long.  The velvety tissue connecting the lobes of anthers forms a cap on top of the stamens.  Its flowers have numerous carpels.  Its mature, oval, yellow fruit are 6 by 4 centimeters and covered in fleshy, pointed projections.  Its broad, smooth, oval seeds are 8 by 4 millimeters with a prominent caruncle at their base.

Reproductive biology
The pollen of Annona paludosa is shed as permanent tetrads.

Habitat and distribution
It grows in marshy meadows.

Uses
It was reported by the American agronomist and botanist Edward Lewis Sturtevant in 1919 to have edible, juicy, yellow fruit.

References

External links
 

paludosa
Flora of Brazil
Flora of French Guiana
Flora of Guyana
Flora of Suriname
Flora of Venezuela
Plants described in 1775
Edible fruits
Taxa named by Jean Baptiste Christian Fusée-Aublet